Irene Tobar (born 5 May 1989) is an Ecuadorian professional footballer. She was part of the Ecuadorian squad for the 2015 FIFA Women's World Cup.

References

External links
 
 Profile  at F.E.F.
 
 

1989 births
Living people
Sportspeople from Guayaquil
Ecuadorian women's footballers
Women's association football goalkeepers
Ecuador women's international footballers
2015 FIFA Women's World Cup players
21st-century Ecuadorian women